The Roman Catholic Diocese of Agats is a diocese located in the city of Agats in the Ecclesiastical province of Merauke in Indonesia.

History
 May 29, 1969: Established as the Diocese of Agats from the Metropolitan Archdiocese of Merauke

Leadership
 Bishops of Agats (Roman rite)
 Bishop Aloysius Murwito, O.F.M. (June 7, 2002 – present)
 Bishop Alphonsus Augustus Sowada, O.S.C. (May 29, 1969 – May 9, 2001)

References
 GCatholic.org
 Catholic Hierarchy

Roman Catholic dioceses in Indonesia
Christian organizations established in 1969
Roman Catholic dioceses and prelatures established in the 20th century